Gastroesophageal varices may refer to:
 Esophageal varices, dilated sub-mucosal veins in esophagus
 Gastric varices, dilated submucosal veins in the stomach